Diego Martínez Barrio (25 November 1883, in Seville – 1 January 1962) was a Spanish politician during the Second Spanish Republic, Prime Minister of Spain between 9 October 1933 and 26 December 1933 and was briefly appointed again by Manuel Azaña on 19 July 1936 - two days after the beginning of the Spanish Civil War. From 16 March 1936 to 30 March 1939 Martínez was President of the Cortes. In 1936, he was briefly the interim President of the Second Spanish Republic, from 7 April to 10 May.

Biography
Barrio was born in Seville. A member of the Radical Republican Party, he was the Minister in the Alejandro Lerroux government but later he left the party for dissatisfaction with the politics of Lerroux.

Martínez consequently founded and led the Republican Union and participated in the Spanish Popular Front, being elected to government in 1936. He led the integration of the Republican Union into the Popular Front, being elected the speaker of the Cortes (Spanish Parliament). In February 1939, he rejected to replace Manuel Azaña as president of the Republic. Following the resignation of Santiago Casares Quiroga two days after the outbreak of the civil war, he was appointed prime minister on 19 July 1936. As part of his intention to avert war, his cabinet ignored the left wing of the Popular Front, but he would last just a few hours, and he resigned later the same morning, after an unsuccessful appeal to Nationalist General Emilio Mola to avoid war, and was succeeded by José Giral.
He fled the country after Francisco Franco came to power in 1939.

He was the Grand Master of the Grande Oriente Español from 1929 to 1934.

After the fall of the Republic, he went into exile, first to France and then to Mexico, where, in 1945, he was designated  president of the Republic in exile until 1962. Martínez finally returned to Paris, where he died.

In 2000, his remains were moved to Seville.

References

Bibliography
Beevor, Antony. The battle for Spain. The Spanish civil war. Penguin Books. 2006. London. .
Thomas, Hugh. The Spanish Civil War. Penguin Books. London. 2003. 

1883 births
1962 deaths
People from Seville
Radical Republican Party politicians
Republican Union (Spain, 1934) politicians
Presidents of Spain
Prime Ministers of Spain
Members of the Congress of Deputies of the Second Spanish Republic
Politicians from Andalusia
Spanish people of the Spanish Civil War (Republican faction)
Exiles of the Spanish Civil War in France
Spanish Freemasons
Exiles of the Spanish Civil War in Mexico
Interior ministers of Spain
Seville city councillors
Presidents of the Congress of Deputies (Spain)
Deputy Prime Ministers of Spain
Exiled Spanish politicians
Government ministers during the Second Spanish Republic